Hinduja National Thermal Power Station, Vizag is a coal-based thermal power plant located in Palavalasa village in Visakhapatnam district, Andhra Pradesh. The power plant is owned by Hinduja National Power Company Limited, a subsidiary of the Hinduja Group.

The power plant is located on the coast of the Bay of Bengal and it uses sea water for cooling purpose.

Capacity
The planned capacity of the power plant in 1040 MW (2x520 MW)

References

External links

 Vizag Thermal Power Station at SourceWatch

Coal-fired power stations in Andhra Pradesh
Buildings and structures in Visakhapatnam district
2015 establishments in Andhra Pradesh
Energy infrastructure completed in 2015